The Scandinavian Senior Open was a men's professional golf tournament for players aged 50 and above as part of the European Seniors Tour. It was played in Denmark from 2005 to 2007. The 2005 and 2006 events were held at Royal Copenhagen Golf Club, Kongens Lyngby, while the 2006 tournament was played at Helsingør Golf Club, Helsingør. The prize fund was €250,000.

Winners

External links
Coverage on the European Senior Tour's official site

Former European Senior Tour events
Golf tournaments in Denmark
Recurring sporting events established in 2005
Recurring sporting events disestablished in 2007